Clear as Day is the debut studio album by season ten American Idol winner Scotty McCreery. The album was released on October 4, 2011 in the United States. Clear as Day also became the first debut album from an American Idol winner to reach number one on the US Billboard 200 since Ruben Studdard's Soulful in 2003, selling 197,000 copies in its first week.

McCreery broke records as the first country act to debut at number one with their first studio album, and at 18 years old, the youngest man to open at the top of the chart with their debut release.  The album had since been certified platinum on January 6, 2012.

Background
Scotty McCreery began working on his album soon after he was crowned the winner of the tenth season of American Idol.  McCreery described the album as having "some old country influences and elements" that he grew up with, such as Hank Williams, Conway Twitty and Merle Haggard, but "it also has a contemporary feel with fun up-tempo songs."  He said the title track, "Clear as Day", is one of his favorites on the album and he loves the message behind the song.  The album includes a cover of a song by Keith Urban, "Walkin’ the Country", released when he was in the band The Ranch.

Singles
 "I Love You This Big" was released as the debut and coronation single by Scotty McCreery. It debuted and peaked at number 11 on the Billboard Hot 100. It also peaked at number 15 on the Hot Country Songs chart.
 "The Trouble with Girls" was released as the second single from the album, which premiered on radio on August 30, 2011, and released onto iTunes and Amazon.com on September 1, 2011. It debuted at number 84 on the Billboard Hot 100 and had since reached number 55.
 "Water Tower Town" was released as the third single from the album for country radio on April 9, 2012. McCreery subsequently reworked the lyrics as "Bojangles Town" for a series of TV advertisements about the Bojangles' Famous Chicken 'n Biscuits restaurant chain.

Reception

Upon its release, Clear as Day received generally mixed reviews from most music critics. At Metacritic, which assigns a normalized rating out of 100 to reviews from mainstream critics, the album received an average score of 51, based on 8 reviews, which indicates "Mixed or average reviews".

Jerry Shriver of USA Today gave the album 2 stars out of 4, saying that the album was "strictly paint-by-numbers country, with some mildly interesting colors occasionally dabbed inside the lines." Stephen Thomas Erlewine of AllMusic gave it two stars out of five, saying that although some of the songs had "signs of life" to them, "the songs and production demand that all energy come from young Scotty, who amiably sleepwalks through the tunes, expecting his 'aw shucks' smile will translate onto record. That it doesn’t is not necessarily on his shoulders -- it’s better to place the blame on the machine, here run by producer Mark Bright." Rolling Stone critic Caryn Ganz also gave the album two stars out of five, stating that "his debut – a ho-hum jaunt through an America full of dog-eared Bibles, rugged pickup trucks and girls 'hot as July, sweet as sunshine' – works overtime playing up his wide-eyed charm." Chris Willman, writing for Reuters, gave it a mixed review, singling out "The Trouble With Girls" as having "sweetly playful lyrics" but adding that "the sappy music seems to have been written for a different set of words, as if McCreery were supposed to be singing about Jesus taking the wheel, not chick magnetism."

Melinda Newman, writing for HitFix, gave it a B− rating, saying "McCreery has a voice meant for country. It’s deep, resonant, and for someone so young, he also had a good command of nuance...the sound is so clean and clear, if it were a floor, you could eat off it...there is no attempt whatsoever to make any song here palatable for a country crossover to pop — and that is a compliment." Joey Guerra, writing for the Houston Chronicle, gave it a positive review, noting that "there are a surprising and refreshing number of uptempo numbers, and the entire thing clearly establishes his persona, unlike so many post-Idol debut efforts." Additionally, he said that of the two albums being released by the 2011 American Idol finalists (referring to Lauren Alaina's debut album, which would be released a week after Clear As Day), "(Clear As Day) is clearly the stronger of the two, and it's no surprise. He's a more natural performer and seems unfettered by NashVegas trappings or mainstream radio cynicism. Country music just seems to be an extension of who he is. The songs are age-appropriate, heartfelt and sincere.".

Chart performance
Clear as Day debuted at number one on the Billboard 200, with first week sales of 197,000 copies. McCreery became the first country act to debut at number one with their first studio album. At 18-years old, McCreery also became the youngest man to debut at the top of the chart with their debut release breaking Omarion's record, who was 20 when O debuted at number one in 2005.

As of April 2013, the album had sold 1,166,000 copies in the United States.

Track listing

Personnel
Adapted from Clear As Day liner notes.

 Mark Bright - string arrangements (track 4)
 Perry Coleman - background vocals (tracks 1, 4, 5, 9, 10)
 Eric Darken - percussion (tracks 3-5, 7, 9-11)
 Carl Gorodetzky - string contractor (track 4)
 Wes Hightower - background vocals (tracks 3, 6-8, 12)
 Mike Johnson - pedal steel guitar (tracks 4, 6-8, 12)
 Charlie Judge - string conductor (track 4), string arrangements (track 4), keyboards (tracks 3, 5-12), programming (track 4), squeezebox (track 12), synthesizer (track 4) 
 Paul Leim - drums (all tracks except 1, 2)
 Greg Leisz - banjo (track 1), acoustic guitar (tracks 1, 2), pedal steel guitar (tracks 1, 2)
 Scotty McCreery - lead vocals (all tracks)
 Brent Mason - electric guitar (all tracks except 1, 2)
 Destinee Monroe - background vocals (track 2)
 Paris Monroe - background vocals (track 2)
 Gordon Mote - piano (tracks 3, 5, 9-11)
 The Nashville String Machine - strings (track 4)
 Jimmy Nichols - piano (tracks 4, 6-8, 12)
 Tim Pierce - electric guitar (tracks 1, 2), high-string acoustic guitar (track 2)
 Jerry Roe - drums (tracks 1, 2)
 Matt Rollings - Hammond B-3 organ (tracks 1, 2)
 Leland Sklar - bass guitar (tracks 1, 2)
 Jimmie Lee Sloas - bass guitar (all tracks except 1, 2)
 Joe Spivey - fiddle (tracks 3, 9)
 Neil Thrasher - background vocals (track 11)
 Ilya Toshinsky - acoustic guitar (all tracks except 1, 2), resonator guitar (track 10), mandolin (tracks 3, 9)
 Jennifer Wrinkle - background vocals (tracks 5, 7-11)
 Jonathan Yudkin - cello (track 9), contrabass (track 9), string arrangements (track 9), viola (track 9), violin (track 9)

Charts

Weekly Charts

Year-End Charts

Decade-end charts

Singles

Certifications

References 

2011 debut albums
Mercury Nashville albums
Scotty McCreery albums
Albums produced by Mark Bright (record producer)
19 Recordings albums